Kan (Khan) Bonfils (October 7, 1967– January 5, 2015) was a Korean-Danish actor.

Early life 
He was born in Korea and adopted when he was 5 years old by Knud Erik Bonfils. He was raised in Denmark.

He relocated to London to fulfil his dream. He trained at the Webber Douglas Academy of Dramatic Art. He was a trained martial artist and studied Wing Chun Kung Fu from Austin Goh. He was also a practitioner of Yin Style Ba Gua Zhang in London since 2008.

Career
Bonfils had a brief modelling career before starting acting. He was a model for Michiko Kochino, Hermes, Oswald Boateng, among others.

Bonfils' film credits include Star Wars: Episode I – The Phantom Menace (1999) as Jedi Master Saesee Tiin, Sky Captain and the World of Tomorrow (2004), Body Armour (2007) and Traveller (2013).

His other film credits include  ''Lara Croft Tomb Raider: The Cradle of Life (2003), Batman Begins (2005), and the James Bond films Tomorrow Never Dies (1997) as Isagura and Skyfall (2012).

Bonfils performed onstage as well. He acted in the West End: Miss Saigon at Drury Lane, Theatre Royal London and The King & I at London Palladium where he performed the lead with Elaine Paige.

Personal life and demise
On 5 January 2015, Bonfils was rehearsing an upcoming stage production of Dante's Inferno when he collapsed. Although CPR was attempted, he could not be resuscitated; he was pronounced dead by paramedics. He was 42 years old.

Filmography
His film credits include:
Tomorrow Never Dies (1997) - Satoshi Isagura (uncredited)
Shadow Run (1998) - Baz
Star Wars: Episode I – The Phantom Menace (1999) - Saesee Tiin
Lara Croft Tomb Raider: The Cradle of Life (2003) - Reiss' Guard
Sky Captain and the World of Tomorrow (2004) - Creepy
Batman Begins (2005) - League of Shadows Warrior #3
Body Armour (2007) - Ozu
Tribe (2011) - Tolui
Skyfall (2012) - Silva's henchman
Traveller (2013) - Tolui
Razors: The Return of Jack the Ripper (2016) - JK

References

External links

British male film actors
2015 deaths
20th-century British male actors
21st-century British male actors
Place of birth missing
Alumni of the Webber Douglas Academy of Dramatic Art
1972 births